Feodor Chin is an American actor, producer, writer and director. Chin starred as the antagonist "Benny" in Juwan Chung's Baby opposite David Huynh, the protagonist. Baby won a Special Jury Award for Best Feature Length Film, Narrative at the 2007 Los Angeles Asian Pacific Film Festival, among other awards.

He also starred as pioneering actor and artist Keye Luke in Timothy Tau's short film bio-pic Keye Luke, which premiered at the 2012 Los Angeles Asian Pacific Film Festival and which was also Closing Night Film of the inaugural 2013 Seattle Asian American Film Festival.

Chin also voices the character of Zenyatta from Blizzard Entertainment's game, Overwatch.

Early life
Chin was born and raised in San Francisco, California, and is a graduate of the University of California, Los Angeles. He has also trained at the American Conservatory Theater in San Francisco and the Upright Citizens Brigade Theater.

Career

Film, Television and Writing
Under his banner Iron Oxide Productions, Chin also wrote, directed and starred in the short film "Spice It Up", which won an Audience Choice Award at the 2011 HollyShorts Film Festival. Chin wrote, produced and starred in the TV Pilot "Golden Boy" (directed by William Lu), which has screened at film festivals such as the Los Angeles Asian Pacific Film Festival and the DisOrient Film Festival.

Chin has also written a pilot, along with Will Henning, for a TV series tentatively titled Chinatown Squad, about a police squad responsible for cleaning up corruption in 1890 San Francisco Chinatown and which Stephane Gauger directed and produced. In it, he stars as Pistol Pete, a Chinatown mob boss who dons European clothes, a character who is also based on the real-life historical figure of Little Pete. The pilot also stars Baby co-stars David Huynh and Robert Wu, as well as Kelvin Han Yee. He received an Honorable Mention for the screenplay at the 2014 Los Angeles Asian Pacific Film Festival - Project Catalyst.

Chin played the antagonist "Benny" in Juwan Chung's Baby opposite the protagonist "Baby," played by David Huynh - the film won a Special Jury Award for Best Feature Length Film, Narrative at the 2007 Los Angeles Asian Pacific Film Festival, among other accolades. He also starred as Keye Luke in Timothy Tau's short film bio-pic Keye Luke, which screened at the 2012 and 2013 Los Angeles Asian Pacific Film Festival, the DisOrient Film Festival, the Asian American International Film Festival, and which was also Closing Night Film of the inaugural 2013 Seattle Asian American Film Festival. Chin has also appeared in independent films such as Byron Q's Raskal Love (as Vanna Fut's father), Dominic Mah's What If People Died and Phil Gorn's S.F., short films such as William Lu's ATF: Asian Task Force (as well as an appearance in William Lu's feature film Comfort), and web Series such as Timothy Tau's Quantum Cops (as "Bronson Law") and Andrea Lwin's Slanted (playing "Truman", Andrea's brother).

As a writer, and in addition to writing Chinatown Squad, Golden Boy and Spice It Up!, Chin has also written, along with Jolene Kim, a pilot script for the TV project "Diamond Head", which won 1st Runner Up in the "Hawaii" category of the 12th Annual CAPE (Coalition for Asian Pacifics in Entertainment) New Writer Awards in 2012.

On TV, Chin has appeared on Big Little Lies (as Kevin), The Affair (as Chen), Jane the Virgin (as Dr. Park), Lethal Weapon (as The Florist), Future Man (as the Bartender), Weird City (as Doctor Lance), and Good Trouble (as Jian). Chin has also appeared as "Dan Chang" in the Lifetime movie, Lost Boy, opposite Virginia Madsen. Chin's other TV credits include roles on Speechless, Lopez (as John), New Girl (as the Waiter), The Mindy Project (as The Karate Guy), Bunheads (as Jason), The Bold and the Beautiful (as the International Buyer), Nash Bridges (as Jay), and General Hospital.

Voicework
Chin has also done voicework for video and computer games, most notably voicing the robot monk Zenyatta in Blizzard Entertainment's game, Overwatch, as well as Splinter in Teenage Mutant Ninja Turtles: Out of the Shadows. He has also done voices for games such as Red Dead Redemption 2 (local pedestrian population voices), Far Cry 5 (for the "Lost On Mars" Downloadable Content (DLC)), Metal Gear Survive (as Dan), Paladins (as Zhin), Guild Wars 2: Heart of Thorns (as Shiro Tagachi), Square Enix's Sleeping Dogs (as Tran), Blizzard Entertainment's World of Warcraft: Mists of Pandaria (as Mudmug) and World of Warcraft: Warlords of Draenor, 2K Games' XCOM: Enemy Unknown (as Shaojie Zhang) and XCOM 2, Evolve(various voices), the 2013 game based on the Alien franchise, Aliens: Colonial Marines (as Weyland Yutani), The Bureau: XCOM Declassified and THQ's New Legends.

Chin has also voiced the main villain "Evil Lord" in the animated CG film Monkey King: Hero is Back also starring the voices of Jackie Chan and James Hong. He has also voiced characters in various animated series such as Regular Show (as Earl, Game and Joe) and the animated short Legendary Place (as Baba Lee), created by Calvin Wong and which screened on Cartoon Network and was also produced by Cartoon Network Studios.

He also has performed voicework for audiobooks such as Timothy Dalrymple's Jeremy Lin: The Reason for the Linsanity and received an Earphones Award from AudioFile for his narration of Snakehead by Patrick Raden Keefe and for his narration of Richard C. Morais' Buddhaland Brooklyn and has provided narrations for "Books on Tapes" selections including Hotel on the Corner of Bitter and Sweet, Jay Caspian Kang's The Dead Do Not Improve, Ed Lin's Ghost Month, Joyful Wisdom, Journey of a Thousand Miles, and The Physics of the Impossible.

Theatrical and Stage Work
Chin has also appeared on stage at The Colony Theater as "Jinwu" in Climbing Everest, as Malcolm in A Noise Within theater's production of Macbeth, as Dr. Albert Chang in John Pollono's Rules of Seconds, as George Deever in The Matrix Theater Company's multi-racial production of Arthur Miller's All My Sons, as Mr. Wang in Uranium Madhouse's production of Bertolt Brecht's A Man's a Man, A Winter People, Chay Yew's adaptation of The Cherry Orchard at the Boston Court in Pasadena, as Chester in Artist at Play's production of Michael Golamco's Cowboy Versus Samurai, and various plays with the Lodestone Theatre Ensemble, including Claim to Fame, Grace Kim and the Spiders from Mars, Ten to Life, Choke, in the Company of Angels production of Henry Ong's Fabric and in Chalk Repertory Theater's productions of Oscar Wilde's Lady Windermere's Fan, The Flash Festival at the La Brea Tar Pits, The Debate Over Courtney O'Connell of Columbus, and in Anton Chekov's Three Sisters (as Andrei Sergeevich Prozorov) opposite Joy Osmanski and Ricardo Antonio Chavira, which was staged at the Historic Masonic Lodge at the Hollywood Forever Cemetery in Los Angeles.

Filmography

Film

Television

Video games

External links

References

University of California, Los Angeles alumni
American film producers
American male film actors
American male screenwriters
American male stage actors
People from San Francisco
American male television actors
American male video game actors
American male voice actors
Living people
21st-century American male actors
Year of birth missing (living people)